Adirondack Railway may refer to:
 Adirondack Railway, a predecessor of the Delaware and Hudson Canal Company
 Adirondack Railway (1976–1981), a heritage railroad which ran between Utica and Lake Placid, New York during the 1980 Winter Olympics
 Adirondack Scenic Railroad, a modern successor to the Adirondack Railway between Utica and Lake Placid